The Green Homes project is a sustainable housing project introduced by UN-Habitat, Federation of Nepalese Chambers of Commerce and Industry (FNCCI), CEN, ENPHO, IHS and SLTDC with support of European Union to promote sustainable housing in Nepal. The project proposes to use green building techniques such as green construction materials, passive solar design, energy efficiency, rooftop farming, and effective waste and water management. Project sites include Lalitpur, Pokhara and Dharan.

References

External links
 – Official website
 – Official website

Housing in Nepal
Sustainable urban planning
United Nations Human Settlements Programme